Leucostethus jota is a species of frog in the family Leucostethus that is endemic to the municipalities of Alexandria, Amalfi, Granada, San Carlos, San Rafael and San Roque in the Department of Antioquia, Colombia. It inhabits premontane humid forests at 1158 to 1514 meters above sea level. Adult males have a snout-cloaca range of 16.1 to 21.6 mm. Adult females have a snout-cloaca range of 17.9 to 23.3 mm.

References

jota
Amphibians of Colombia
Endemic fauna of Colombia
Amphibians described in 2018